After ascending to the thrones of the Commonwealth realms in 1952, Queen Elizabeth II received a number of state and official visits. She usually hosted one or two visiting heads of state each year.

List of visits

Countries who have made state visits

See also 
List of state visits made by Elizabeth II
List of state visits received by Charles III

Sources 

Personal timelines
State visits received
Lists of diplomatic visits by heads of state
Diplomatic visits to the United Kingdom
Elizabeth II
Elizabeth II